Yvan Baker  (born December 8, 1977) is a Canadian politician who was elected to represent the federal riding of Etobicoke Centre in the 2019 federal election. He is a member of the Liberal Party of Canada. Prior to entering federal politics, he served as the Liberal member of the Legislative Assembly of Ontario for the provincial riding of Etobicoke Centre from 2014 to 2018.

Background
Baker grew up in the West End Toronto neighbourhood of Etobicoke and attended Toronto French School. He graduated with a BBA from the Schulich School of Business at York University and went on to work for Scotiabank. He then accepted a position as an Executive Assistant to the Member of Parliament for Etobicoke Centre Borys Wrzesnewskyj before obtaining his Master of Business Administration from the Tuck School of Business at Dartmouth College, New Hampshire. After graduation Baker became a management consultant with the Boston Consulting Group, working out of the New York and Toronto offices before starting his own consultancy based out of Toronto. Baker previously taught Master of Business Administration students at Schulich School of Business at York University.

Baker has also worked on several charitable initiatives and community projects. These include serving as a board director for Leave out Violence, the Emerging Leaders Network, and Global Grassroots, where he supported emerging female leaders in Rwanda on projects addressing issues such as lack of access to water, domestic violence and health education. He is a recipient of the Queen Elizabeth II Diamond Jubilee Medal.

He is in a relationship with Amanda Simard, the former Liberal member of the Legislative Assembly of Ontario for the provincial riding of Glengarry-Prescott-Russell.

Political career

Provincial politics
Baker was elected to the Ontario Legislature in 2014 as the MPP for Etobicoke Centre.  He served as parliamentary assistant to Minister of Finance Charles Sousa. Previously, Baker served as parliamentary assistant to Deb Matthews, president of the Treasury Board from 2014 to 2016.

Other current legislative roles include parliamentary assistant to the Minister Responsible for Digital Government; commissioner, Board of Internal Economy; and vice-chair, Standing Committee on Finance and Economic Affairs.

Private members' public bills 
In May 2015, Baker introduced the Ontario Flag Day Act, 2015, which sought to proclaim May 21 of each year as Ontario Flag Day. The bill passed with the unanimous support of all three parties.

Baker also introduced the Pathways to Post-secondary Excellence Act, which would make it easier for high school students to research post-secondary educational institutions.  This would be done by centralizing data in the areas of admission, student experience and outcomes for recent graduates ". The bill was endorsed by the Ontario Undergraduate Student Alliance, Canadian Federation of Students, the College Student Alliance and the Graduate Student Alliance. The bill did not proceed past first reading.

In 2017, Baker proposed the Phones Down, Heads Up Act, a bill to fine pedestrians between $50 and $125 for texting while crossing the street. The bill attracted criticism from Ontario New Democratic Party MPP Cheri DiNovo and pedestrian-safety advocacy group Walk Toronto, who argued that there is little evidence that distracted walking is a risk, and that it shifts the safety onus from drivers to pedestrians.

Community involvement 
In Etobicoke Centre, Baker hosted Community Recognition Awards annually which highlighted local individuals and organizations for making a difference in the community. The awards were available in four categories; Outstanding Volunteer Service to the Community, Outstanding Volunteer Service to Seniors, Outstanding Volunteer Service to the Community by Youth and Outstanding Service by Professional Staff. Approximately 30 individuals and organizations are honoured every year.

An annual Government and Community Services Fair was co-hosted every year by Baker and Etobicoke—Lakeshore MPP Peter Milczyn. In 2015, the event featured more than 110 exhibitors from the provincial government, agencies and community organizations.

Baker also hosted monthly Seniors Advisory Group meetings, which discussed topics that are important to seniors in Etobicoke Centre.

Federal politics
On October 30, 2018, Baker announced his intention to seek the Liberal Party of Canada nomination in the federal riding of Etobicoke Centre.

Election results

Federal

Provincial

References

External links

1977 births
21st-century Canadian politicians
Boston Consulting Group people
Canadian people of Ukrainian descent
Living people
Ontario Liberal Party MPPs
People from Etobicoke
Politicians from Toronto
Tuck School of Business alumni
York University alumni
Liberal Party of Canada MPs
Members of the House of Commons of Canada from Ontario